Pierre Lellouche (born 3 May 1951) is a French lawyer and politician of the Republicans who served as Secretary of State for Foreign Trade under the Minister of Economy, Finance and Industry Christine Lagarde in the government of Prime Minister François Fillon. He was elected deputy of Sarcelles in 1993, and retained his seat at the National Assembly until 2002.

Early life and education
Lellouche was born in Tunis, Tunisia, among the small local Jewish community, one of four children of Noël Lellouche, who had fought in the Free French Forces during World War II. In 1956, when Tunisia became independent, the family moved to Paris, where Noël Lellouche worked for Renault and then ran a restaurant.

He studied law at Paris Nanterre University, Sciences Po and Harvard Law School, where he received his SJD in 1978 with a doctoral thesis on the internationalization of the nuclear fuel cycle.

Political career

Early beginnings
After working for the Iranian Atomic Agency and before joining the administration of the IRIS, directed by Pascal Boniface, he joined the French Institute of International Relations (IFRI) from 1979 to 1988 where he dealt with political and strategic issues and became deputy editor of the magazine Politique étrangère.

Lellouche was a member of the National Assembly of France, first for Val d'Oise's 8th constituency (1993-1997) and later for Paris' 4th constituency (1997-2009).
In parliament, Lellouche served on the Defense Committee (1993-1994, 1997–2002) and the Committee on Foreign Affairs (1995-1997, 2002–2007). In addition to his committee assignments, he was a member of the French delegation to the NATO Parliamentary Assembly from 1997 until 2009; he served as the Assembly's president from November 2004 to 17 November 2006.

From 2002, Lellouche was also a member of "The Reformers" within the UMP group, which advocated deep reform of the administration and liberalization of the economy. He also became widely known for the 2003 Lellouche law outlawing discrimination based on a variety of immutable characteristics, including national origin. This law has been described by  Haaretz as "among the world's most potent tools to fight the growing Boycott, Divestment and Sanctions movement."

Following the 2007 French legislative election, his political allies Nicolas Sarkozy and François Fillon supported Lellouche as candidate for the chairmanship of the National Assembly's Committee on Foreign Affairs or the Defence Committee, but this was eventually vetoed by the chairman of the UMP's parliamentary group, Jean-François Copé.

On the local level, Lellouche was also a municipal councillor of Cannes (1995-2001) and a councillor of Paris (since 2001; reelected in 2008).

Career in government
In 2009, President Nicolas Sarkozy appointed Lellouche as special envoy for Afghanistan and Pakistan at the Ministry of Foreign Affairs. In this capacity, he worked with his counterparts from the US (Richard Holbrooke), Germany (Bernd Mützelburg) and the UK (Sherard Cowper-Coles).

Governmental functions
 Secretary of State for Foreign Trade: 2010-2012
 Secretary of State for European Affairs: 2009-2010

As State Secretary for European Affairs, Lellouche was involved in the negotiations on the European Financial Stability Facility (EFSF) in 2010. In response to the 2010 Russian wildfires, he told Le Figaro that the EU should pool assets to create a European emergency force and build mutual assistance capabilities to deal with emergencies.

Later career
Upon returning to parliament, Lellouche served on the Committee on Foreign Affairs again from 2012 until 2017. In this capacity, he joined François Fillon, Étienne Blanc, Éric Ciotti and Valérie Pécresse on an official trip to Iraq in September 2014.

In 2016, Lellouche's call for the impeachment of President François Hollande for allegedly  disclosing classified information to journalists, was dismissed by a cross-party steering committee.

Lellouche was also the French negotiator concerning the International Thermonuclear Experimental Reactor in Cadarache.

Ahead of the Republicans' 2016 presidential primary, Lellouche endorsed François Fillon as the party's candidate for the 2017 French presidential election. Amid the Fillon affair, he resigned from the campaign team. In an open letter, he also announced his plans to leave politics.

Other activities
 European Leadership Network (ELN), Member
 French Institute of International Relations (IFRI), co-founder and Member of the Board of Directors
 Nuclear Threat Initiative (NTI), Member 
 Trilateral Commission, Member

Political positions

European integration
Lellouche called the UK Conservative Party's policy on the EU "pathetic" and a kind of political autism, claiming "They have essentially castrated your UK influence in the European parliament."

Foreign policy
Lellouche is considered to be a supporter of strong cooperation with the United States of America.
 
After the 2022 Russian invasion of Ukraine, he explained Crimea would stay russian because no one will go to war for Ukrain and asked in 2023 if it is not time to wonder about a way out of this war ?.

Domestic policy
Lellouche defended a traditional view of the family during the discussions concerning the Pacte civil de solidarité (PACS), a form of civil union, during which he mentioned some "homophobic" arguments according to several observers ("You just have to sterilize them!"). However, later on in 2003 he was in favour of a law introducing harsher punishments for abuses against homosexuals.

Lellouche is also a strong opponent of the solidarity tax on wealth (ISF) first voted under François Mitterrand.

In 2015, Lellouche opposed a parliamentary decision to create a $60-million fund to compensate Holocaust victims deported by French state rail firm SNCF to Nazi concentration camps in a move also intended to protect the company from future U.S. litigation.

In response to the January 2015 Île-de-France attacks, Lellouche publicly opposed a bill proposed by Prime Minister Manuel Valls to let France's intelligence services deploy fly-on-the-wall spying devices more easily against suspected terrorists.

Israel
In 2003, in the newspaper Liberation, he declared there was "a new anti-Semitism, linked to the crisis in the Middle East and which appeared about twenty years ago. In 2014, he voted against the resolution on the Palestinian State but protested "against the unbearable and unacceptable interference of the Prime Minister Benjamin Netanyahu on the vote of the French Parliament". In 2015, he discovers having been monitored by the NSA. In 2017, he reaffirms his position on “the necessary halt to the construction of new settlements”, but declares himself against a “strategy of one-upmanship against Israel”.

Personal life
Lellouche has been married twice, both marriages ending in divorce.

References

1951 births
Living people
Tunisian Jews
Jewish French politicians
People from Tunis
Politicians from Paris
Sciences Po alumni
Harvard University alumni
Politicians of the French Fifth Republic
Rally for the Republic politicians
Union for a Popular Movement politicians
The Republicans (France) politicians
Deputies of the 10th National Assembly of the French Fifth Republic
Deputies of the 11th National Assembly of the French Fifth Republic
Deputies of the 12th National Assembly of the French Fifth Republic
Deputies of the 13th National Assembly of the French Fifth Republic
Deputies of the 14th National Assembly of the French Fifth Republic
French columnists
Councillors of Paris
Members of Parliament for Paris